The Shire of Dundas is a local government area in the Goldfields-Esperance region of Western Australia.

History

The shire was first established as the second Dundas Road District on 21 June 1929, when the Norseman Road District was abolished and replaced by a re-established Dundas board. (An earlier Dundas Road District had existed from 1895 to 1918 before amalgamating to form the Norseman district.)

It was declared a shire and named the Shire of Dundas with effect from 1 July 1961 following the passage of the Local Government Act 1960, which reformed all remaining road districts into shires.

Towns and localities
The towns and localities of the Shire of Dundas with population and size figures based on the most recent Australian census:

Notable councillors
 Emil Nulsen, Dundas Roads Board chairman 1929–1931; later a state MP

Heritage-listed places

As of 2023, 78 places are heritage-listed in the Shire of Dundas, of which seven are on the State Register of Heritage Places.

See also
 Dundas, Western Australia

References

External links
 

Nullarbor Plain